Kensal House is a housing estate of two curved blocks of 68 housing association flats at the northern end of Ladbroke Grove, London, completed in 1937 and designed by the architect Maxwell Fry. It was the first modernist block in the UK designed to be occupied by the working class and on completion in 1937, was widely thought to be a prototype for modern living.

Design
It was commissioned and financed by the Gas Light and Coke Company (GLCC) to provide 68 "working-class flats", housing 380 people. It was the first modernist block in the UK designed for this purpose. The project included a community centre, communal laundry, canteen and a nursery school. The development was unusual in that there was no electricity provided, rather gas fires, coke fires, gas cookers, gas water heaters, and gas-powered irons.

The project was designed by Maxwell Fry, but was developed by a committee of five architects and the social reformer Elizabeth Denby, who had worked with Fry at the Peckham Pioneer Health Centre. The GLCC wanted to show that a modern building could be run cheaply and powered safely by gas. Fry wanted to create what he called an urban village, and he and Denby wanted to offer working people "healthier, happier, safer, and more fulfilling lives". According to the Open University, "Kensal House marks the point in the story of British Modernist architecture when the social/political ideals of the early modernists come to the fore." On completion in 1937 it was widely thought to be a prototype for modern living.

Depictions

In 1937, the estate was the subject of an 11-minute documentary, Welcome to Kensal House, produced by the British Commercial Gas Association. In 1940, Kensal House provided the cover image for James Maude Richards's An Introduction to Modern Architecture, published by Penguin Books.

In 1942, Kensal House was featured prominently on a lithograph poster "Your Britain. Fight for It Now", designed by Abram Games, his second poster for the Army Bureau of Current Affairs. The poster contrasts derelict slum housing with the clean, white and modern aesthetic of Kensal House. Further wording on the poster reads: "Clean, airy and well planned dwellings make a great contribution to the Rehousing movement. This is a fine example of a block of workers' flats built in London in 1936."

Recognition
Kensal House was a RIBA Royal Gold Medal winner in 1963. It is Grade II* listed with Historic England, as is the associated Kensal House Day Nursery.

References

External links
Welcome to Kensal House, an 11-minute documentary, filmed in 1937

Residential buildings completed in 1937
Ladbroke Grove
Apartment buildings in London
Modernist architecture in London
Grade II* listed buildings in the Royal Borough of Kensington and Chelsea
1937 establishments in England